The Chief Joseph Custer Reserve is an Indian reserve of the Peter Ballantyne Cree Nation in Saskatchewan. It is located in the city of Prince Albert, making it an urban reserve.

References

Indian reserves in Saskatchewan
Urban Indian reserves in Canada
Division No. 15, Saskatchewan
Peter Ballantyne Cree Nation
Prince Albert, Saskatchewan